Pseudiragoides spadix is a species of moth of the family Limacodidae. It is found on the western side of the Fansipan in the Vietnamese Yunnan mountains.

The length of the forewings is 15–16 mm for males. They have a wingspan of 32–34 mm. Adults have been found in March, April and September and were caught at altitudes between 1,600 and 2,240 meters. There are probably two generations per year.

Etymology
The specific name spadix  (meaning greyish brown, brown or reddish brown) is Latin and refers to the colour of the imago.

References

External links 
 The Barcode of Life Data Systems (BOLD)

Limacodidae
Moths of Asia
Moths described in 2009